Koutrafas may refer to:

Kato Koutrafas, Cyprus
Pano Koutrafas, Cyprus